Gentle on My Mind was an LP album by Patti Page, released by Columbia Records in 1968, produced and arranged by Don Costa, and conducted by Patti's long-time
accompanist, Rocky Cole.

The album was reissued, combined with the 1965 Patti Page album Hush, Hush, Sweet Charlotte, in compact disc format, by Collectables Records on August 24, 1999.

Track listing

Patti Page albums
Columbia Records albums
1968 albums
Albums produced by Don Costa
Albums arranged by Don Costa